William Richard Peltier, Ph.D., D.Sc. (hc)  (born 1943), is university professor of physics at the University of Toronto. He is director of the Centre for Global Change Science , past principal investigator of the Polar Climate Stability Network , and the scientific director of Canada's largest supercomputer centre, SciNet . He is a fellow of the Royal Society of Canada, of the American Geophysical Union, of the American Meteorological Society, and of the Norwegian Academy of Science and Letters..

His research interests include: atmospheric and oceanic waves and turbulence, geophysical fluid dynamics, physics of the planetary interior, and planetary climate.

He is notable for his seminal contributions to the understanding of the dynamics of the deep Earth, both concerning the nature of the mantle convection process and the circulation of the visco-elastic interior caused by the loading of the surface by continental scale ice sheet loads. His gravitationally self-consistent global theory of Ice-Earth-Ocean interactions has become widely employed internationally in the explanation of the changes of sea level that accompany both the growth and decay of grounded ice on the continents, both during the Late Quaternary era of Earth history and under modern global warming conditions. His models of the space-time variations of continental ice cover since the last maximum of glaciation are employed universally to provide the boundary conditions needed to enable modern coupled climate models to be employed to reconstruct past climate conditions. A most notable contribution to work of this kind has been his theory of the so-called Dansgaard-Oeschger millennial timescale oscillation of glacial climate.  He has been the primary contributor to the global reconstructions ICE-3G, ICE-4G, ICE-5G (VM2), and the most recent ICE-6G (VM5)model. These models are important for the quantification of post-glacial rebound and late Pleistocene to Holocene variations in sea level.

Education 

 1967 B.Sc., University of British Columbia
 1969 M.Sc. in Physics, University of Toronto
 1971 Ph.D. in Physics, University of Toronto

Teaching appointments 
 1971-72 Lecturer, Department of Physics, University of Toronto
 1973-74 Visiting Assistant Professor, Department of Physics, University of Toronto
 1974-77 Associate Professor, Department of Physics, University of Toronto
 1978  Visiting Professor, Geophysics and Space Physics, U.C.L.A.
 1978-79 Steacie Fellowship Leave, NCAR, Boulder, Colorado
 1977-79 Associate Professor, Department of Physics, University of Toronto
 1979-93 Full Professor, Department of Physics, University of Toronto
 1987-88 Guggenheim Fellowship Leave, DAMTP and Bullard Laboratories, Cambridge University, U.K.
 1993-  University Professor, University of Toronto
 2002-2003 Sabbatical Leave, Professeur Invité, Institute de Physique du Globe de Paris, Université Paris VII
 2004 Professor Invité, Institut de Physique du Globe de Paris, Université Paris VII
 2005–present  Adjunct professor, Dept. of Earth Sciences, University of Waterloo
 2006 Visiting professor, Dept. of Earth Sciences and Bjerknes center for Marine Research, University of Bergen, Norway
 2009 Professeur Invite Ecole Normale Superieure, Paris, 2009

Honours and awards 
 Alfred P. Sloan Foundation Fellowship, 1977-1979
 E.W.R. Steacie Memorial fellowship, 1978-1980
 Kirk Bryan Award  Geological Society of America
 Killam Senior Research Fellowship Canada Council for the Arts. 1980-1982
 Fellow of the American Geophysical Union, 1986-
 Fellow of the Royal Society of Canada, 1986-
 John Simon Guggenheim Memorial Foundation Fellowship, 1986-1988
 Fellow of Clare Hall, Cambridge University, 1988-
 Senior fellow of Massey College University of Toronto, 1989-
 Fellow of the American Meteorological Society, 1991-
 Patterson Medal of the Atmospheric Environment Service of Canada, 1992
 Appointment to the rank of university professor, highest rank at the University of Toronto, 1993-
 Distinguished Lecturer of the Canadian Geophysical Union, 1999–2000
 Science Watch listing as the fifth most highly cited earth scientists in the world, all disciplines included, 2001
 Elected as Foreign Member to Fellowship in the Norwegian Academy of Science and Letters, 2004
 Bancroft Award of the Royal Society of Canada, 2004
 J. Tuzo Wilson Medal of the Canadian Geophysical Union, 2004
 Vetlesen Prize, the G. Unger Vetlesen Foundation of New York, 2004
 Leiv Erikson Fellow, Norwegian Research Council, Bjerknes Institute for Climate Research, Univ. of Bergen, 2006
 Miroslaw Romanowski Medal of the Royal Society of Canada, 2006
 Milutin Milankovic Medal of the European Geosciences Union, 2008 web announcement
 CAP Gold medal for Achievement in Physics Canadian Association of Physicists, 2009
 Charles A. Whitten Medal American Geophysical Union, 2010
 The Bower Award and Prize for Achievement in Science - Earth Systems Franklin Institute of Philadelphia, 2010
 The Gerhard Herzberg Canada Gold Medal in Science and Engineering Natural Sciences and Engineering Research Council of Canada, 2011
 Killam Prize in Natural Science Canada Council for the Arts, 2012

See also
 List of University of Waterloo people
List of geophysicists

References

External links
 Home page of Dr. Peltier
 University Professor page for Dr. Peltier
 Science Watch #5 most cited in geosciences, 1991-2001
 March 27, 2007 Toronto Star article "Reassessing the gravity of the situation" 

1943 births
Living people
Canadian physicists
Canadian climatologists
Intergovernmental Panel on Climate Change lead authors
Fellows of the Royal Society of Canada
Wilson Medal recipients
University of Toronto alumni
University of British Columbia alumni
Academic staff of the University of Toronto
Members of the Norwegian Academy of Science and Letters
Presidents of the Canadian Geophysical Union
Fellows of the American Geophysical Union
Fellows of the American Meteorological Society